Włodzimierz Wojciech Smolarek (16 July 1957 – 7 March 2012) was a Polish footballer who played as a winger or an attacking midfielder.

He played most of his 20-year professional career with Widzew Łódź and Utrecht, appearing in more than 200 official games for the former. He amassed Eredivisie totals of 212 matches and 45 goals, over the course of eight seasons.

Smolarek represented Poland in two World Cups, earning 60 caps.

Club career
Born in Aleksandrów Łódzki, Smolarek played for Widzew Łódź and Legia Warsaw in his country. He won the Ekstraklasa championship with the former side in 1981 and 1982, as well as the 1985 Polish Cup.

In 1986, aged 29, Smolarek was allowed to leave the Iron Curtain nation, starting with Eintracht Frankfurt in the Bundesliga where he won the German Cup in his second season, playing the full 90 minutes in the 1–0 win against VfL Bochum. He retired at 39 after eight years in the Netherlands, with Feyenoord and FC Utrecht, then went on to work with the first club as youth coach for nearly one decade.

International career
Smolarek made his debut for the Poland national team on 12 October 1980, in a 1–2 friendly loss in Argentina. Over the next 12 years he appeared in a further 59 internationals, being selected for the squads at two FIFA World Cups: in 1982 he helped the country finish third in Spain, scoring the opener in a 5–1 first group stage win against Peru. Four years later, celebrating his 50th appearance, he netted the only goal in the group phase contest against Portugal (his 12th and penultimate) in an eventual round-of-16 exit.

In October 2009, Smolarek was hired by the Polish Football Association to oversee the national side's youth program.

Career statistics

Club

International

International goals
Poland score listed first, score column indicates score after each Smolarek goal.

Personal life
Smolarek was married to Zdzislawa, fathering sons Euzebiusz and Mariusz. The former was also a footballer and a forward, who also represented Feyenoord and Poland and also had a three-year spell with Borussia Dortmund.

Smolarek died on 7 March 2012 at the age of 54, in his hometown.

References

External links

1957 births
2012 deaths
Footballers from Łódź
Polish footballers
Association football forwards
Ekstraklasa players
Widzew Łódź players
Legia Warsaw players
Bundesliga players
Eintracht Frankfurt players
Eredivisie players
Feyenoord players
FC Utrecht players
Poland international footballers
1982 FIFA World Cup players
1986 FIFA World Cup players
Polish expatriate footballers
Expatriate footballers in Germany
Expatriate footballers in the Netherlands
Polish expatriate sportspeople in Germany
Polish expatriate sportspeople in the Netherlands
Polish football managers
Polish expatriate football managers
Expatriate football managers in the Netherlands